Steagall is a surname of English origin, meaning "dweller by the stile". Notable people with the surname include:

Henry B. Steagall (1873-1943), American politician
Jay Steagall (born 1976), American politician
Red Steagall (born 1938), American actor, musician, poet, and stage performer
Scotty Steagall (1929-2001), American basketball player

See also
Banking Act of 1933, often referred to as the Glass-Steagall Act
Glass–Steagall Act of 1932, a law passed by the United States Congress
Steagall Amendment of 1941, a US federal law
Steagall Glacier, a tributary glacier in the Queen Maud Mountains
Stegall
Steggall